Bewsiella is a genus of mites in the family Laelapidae.

Species
 Bewsiella aelleni (Till, 1958)     
 Bewsiella cloeotis Uchikawa, 1993     
 Bewsiella coelopos Uchikawa, 1993     
 Bewsiella emballonuris Uchikawa, 1993     
 Bewsiella fledermaus Domrow, 1958     
 Bewsiella haradai Uchikawa, 1993     
 Bewsiella nycteris Uchikawa, 1993

References

Laelapidae